John St Leger may refer to: 

John St. Leger (died 1596), of Annery, Devon
John St Leger (1674–1743), Irish judge 
John St Leger (died 1441) of Ulcombe, Kent